Pfeiffera monacantha (syn. Rhipsalis monacantha), the onespined wickerware cactus, is a species of epiphytic cactus, native to Bolivia and northwest Argentina. As its synonym Rhipsalis monacantha it has gained the Royal Horticultural Society's Award of Garden Merit.

Subtaxa
The following subspecies are accepted:
Pfeiffera monacantha subsp. kimnachii (Doweld) Ralf Bauer
Pfeiffera monacantha subsp. monacantha

References

Flora of Bolivia
Flora of Northwest Argentina
Plants described in 1994